Senate Republicans, formerly the Union for a Popular Movement, is a parliamentary group in the French Senate including representatives of The Republicans (LR), formerly the Union for a Popular Movement.

History 
The Union for a Popular Movement group (groupe Union pour un mouvement populaire) in the Senate was officially formed on 10 December 2002 after the foundation of the Union for a Popular Movement earlier that year; at the time of its creation, it included 167 members, an absolute majority, with Josselin de Rohan elected as its first president. The group united 93 out of 94 members of the Rally for the Republic (RPR) group, 40 out of 41 members of the Republicans and Independents (RI) group (associated with Liberal Democracy), 29 out of 54 members of the Centrist Union (UC) group, 4 out of 21 members of the European Democratic and Social Rally (RDSE) group, and 1 non-inscrit. The group maintained its absolute majority until the 2004 renewal.

On 15 January 2008, de Rohan stood down as president of the group to assume the role of president of the Foreign Affairs, Defense and Armed Forces Committee, and was succeeded the same day by the former member of the Radical Party Henri de Raincourt. De Raincourt subsequently stepped down on 6 July 2009, ahead of his appointment to the government, with Gérard Longuet elected unopposed as his successor on 7 July, his only opponent – Eric Doligé – having withdrawn his candidacy before the vote. On 7 March 2011, Longuet departed from the presidency of the group after his appointment as Minister of Defense within the government, with Jean-Claude Gaudin taking his place on 8 March uncontested; though Jean-Pierre Raffarin envisaged the possibility of presenting his candidature, he ultimately supported Gaudin for the post.

The UMP group lost its relative majority in the 2011 renewal, after which the left took control of the upper chamber for the first time in the history of the Fifth Republic. Though Gaudin remained in the Senate after the 2014 renewal, he did not wish to seek the presidency of the group, leaving it to an open contest instead. On 2 October, Bruno Retailleau, a supporter of François Fillon in the disputed 2012 leadership election, was elected president of the group with 79 votes against Sarkozyist Roger Karoutchi with 39 votes and Longuet with 25. On 2 June 2015, the group was renamed 
to The Republicans group (groupe Les Républicains) following the founding congress of the renamed party.

In the 2020 French Senate election the Republicans held their majority.

List of presidents

Historical membership

Founding members 
The UMP group was founded on 10 December 2002 with 167 members, including 93 out of 94 members of the Rally for the Republic (RPR) group, 40 out of 41 members of the Republicans and Independents (RI) group (associated with Liberal Democracy), 29 out of 54 members of the Centrist Union (UC) group, 4 out of 21 members of the European Democratic and Social Rally (RDSE) group, and 1 non-inscrit.

See also 

The Republicans group (National Assembly)

References

External links 
 Lists of senators by political group 
 Historical composition of the Senate and political groups 

Senate (France)
Parliamentary groups in France
The Republicans (France)